The 2002 Western Carolina Catamounts team represented Western Carolina University as a member of the Southern Conference (SoCon) in the 2002 NCAA Division I-AA football season. The Catamounts were led by first-year head coach head coach Kent Briggs and played their home games at Bob Waters Field at E. J. Whitmire Stadium in Cullowhee, North Carolina. Western Carolina compiled an overall record of 5–6 with a mark of 3–5 in conference play, tying for fifth place in the SoCon.

Schedule

References

Western Carolina
Western Carolina Catamounts football seasons
Western Carolina Catamounts football